Cyril Coote (8 April 1913 – 10 April 1973) was a South African cricket umpire. He stood in one Test match, South Africa vs. New Zealand, in 1953. He also umpired a match between the Marylebone Cricket Club (MCC) and North Eastern Transvaal during England's tour to South Africa in 1948–49.

See also
 List of Test cricket umpires

References

1913 births
1973 deaths
Place of birth missing
South African Test cricket umpires